The Match Seller (German: Streichholzhändler) is a 1920 painting by the German Dada and Neue Sachlichkeit artist Otto Dix. The work is in the permanent collection of the Staatsgalerie Stuttgart.

Description
The composition depicts a scene where a homeless and crippled war veteran is seen selling matches on a street in Germany. Several well-dressed passersby flee from the quadrupled and blind amputee, while a dachshund, with its gaze turned toward the viewer, urinates on the veteran's peglegs. As others ignore him, the veteran cries out the phrase “Matches, original Swedish matches!” (German: “Streichhölzer, Echte Schwedenhölzer") written on the composition using white lettering.

Analysis
Painted one year after the end of World War I and the Treaty of Versailles, the composition has been interpreted as the artist’s critique of the Weimar Republic, including the demoralization of its post-war society, the economic inequality that would contribute to the subsequent rise of the National Socialist government, as well as the senselessness of war.

The composition includes collage, a technique invented by the Cubists that became popular among the artists associated with the Dada movement in Germany, including Hannah Höch and Kurt Schwitters. The use of collage allowed artists to shift away from traditional forms of artmaking in favor of more modern and unorthodox materials. Dix began using the collage technique in late 1919. The artist's decision to include newspaper clippings and authentic bank notes from the Weimar Republic in The Match Seller may be understood as a direct reference to the social and economic environments of the early Weimar Germany.

Along with many other works by Dix, The Match Seller was included on the list of works of degenerate art in Nazi Germany and confiscated during 1937 and 1938.

References

1920 paintings
Dada
Paintings by Otto Dix
Weimar culture